"You" is a song by Dutch band Ten Sharp. It was released in March 1991 as their debut single from their first album, Under the Water-Line (1991), and became a hit in many countries, including France, Norway, and Sweden, reaching number one on the countries' charts.

Background and writing
"You" was the band's first single as a duo. The lyrics were written by Ton Groen, while the music was composed by Niels Hermes. French music author Elia Habib described the song as "the notes from the piano are sharply separated with a beautiful consistency and constitute the backdrop of a melody served by the power of Marcel Kapteijn's  voice".

Chart performances
"You" was a number-one hit in Norway, spending 16 weeks in the top ten. In Sweden, the single peaked at number one for two weeks. In France, "You" also peaked at number one for two weeks. "You" peaked at number four in Germany and remained on the chart for 43 weeks, and it reached the same position in Ireland. In Austria, the song reached number two, while in Switzerland, it spent 32 weeks in the top 40, peaking at number three. It was the group's only hit in the UK to date, peaking at number 10.

Track listings

Personnel
 Vocals: Marcel Kapteijn
 Instruments and programming: Niels Hermes
 Produced by Michiel Hoogenboezem & Niels Hermes
 Engineered by Michiel Hoogenboezem
 Guitar on "When The Snow Falls" & "White Gold": Martin Boers
 Bass on "When The Snow Falls" & "White Gold": Ton Groen
 Drums on "When The Snow Falls" & "White Gold": Wil Bouwes
 Recorded at Spitsbergen and Wisseloord Studios
 Mixed at Wisseloord Studios
 Artwork: Theo Stapel

Charts

Weekly charts

Year-end charts

Release history

References

External links
 The official Ten Sharp website

1991 singles
1991 songs
Number-one singles in Norway
Number-one singles in Sweden
SNEP Top Singles number-one singles
Ten Sharp songs